Tabloid Tycoon is a business simulation game released in 2005 in which you run a scandalous newspaper. The aim is to sabotage your rivals, settle lawsuits, give would-be paparazzi jobs and take pictures of the most scandalous things. You have to build your empire so as to make newspapers fresh out of the press.

References

External links 
 

2005 video games
Video games developed in the United States
Windows games
Windows-only games
Business simulation games
Black Lantern Studios games